Inga Sætre (born 11 February 1978) is a Norwegian illustrator and comic writer. She was born in Brøttum in Ringsaker.

Her first comic series was Møkkajentene: Pøh, published in 2002. She has made comic strips for the newspapers Morgenbladet and Aftenposten, and for the magazine Syn og Segn.

She was awarded the Brage Prize in 2011 for the comic novel Fallteknikk.

References

1978 births
Living people
People from Ringsaker
Norwegian illustrators
Norwegian women illustrators
Norwegian comics writers
Norwegian female comics artists
Norwegian comics artists